The Road to Brazil is the name of a series of international association football exhibition games that took place from May 29 to June 7, 2014 in the run up to the 2014 FIFA World Cup. The games have been organized by Soccer United Marketing, Major League Soccer's commercial division.

Participants

Ten countries participated in the Road to Brazil series of matches, representing four continents – Europe, Africa, North America and South America. the teams that had qualified for the World Cup included the following: from Europe, defending champion Spain, Bosnia and Herzegovina and Greece; representing Africa were the African Cup of Nations champion Nigeria and powerhouse Ivory Coast; El Salvador and Honduras from CONCACAF.

Bolivia, El Salvador, Israel and Turkey also participated.

UEFA (5)

CONMEBOL (1)

CONCACAF (2)

CAF (2)

Schedule
Below is the schedule for the matches.

Goalscorers
2 goals

 Edin Džeko
 Didier Drogba
 David Villa

1 goal

 Rudy Cardozo
 Arturo Alvarez
 Kostas Katsouranis
 Panagiotis Kone
 Carlos Costly
 Roger Espinoza
 Omer Damari
 Eran Zahavi
 Gil Vermouth
 Gervinho
 Mevlüt Erdinç
 Caner Erkin

1 own goal

 Maynor Figueroa (playing against Israel)

References

2014 FIFA World Cup
International association football competitions hosted by the United States
2014 in American soccer
May 2014 sports events in the United States
June 2014 sports events in the United States